U-52 may refer to one of the following German submarines:

 , a Type U 51 submarine launched in 1915 and that served in the First World War until surrendered 21 November 1918; broken up at Swansea in 1922
 During the First World War, Germany also had these submarines with similar names:
 , a Type UB III submarine launched in 1917 and sunk on 23 May 1918
 , a Type UC II submarine launched in 1916 and surrendered on 16 January 1919; broken up at Morecambe in 1922
 , a Type VIIB submarine that served in the Second World War until stricken October 1943; scuttled 3 May 1945

Submarines of Germany